Levantines in Turkey or Turkish Levantines, refers to the descendants of Europeans who settled in the coastal cities of the Ottoman Empire to trade, especially after the Tanzimat Era. Their estimated population today is around 1,000. They mainly reside in Istanbul, İzmir and Mersin. Anatolian Muslims called Levantines Frenk (first used for French, then for all non-Orthodox Europeans) and Tatlı Su Frengi ( 'freshwater Frank'; due to their high-standard lifestyle) in addition to Levanten.

Origin and meaning 
The term Levant comes from the French language. It means 'rising' (sun, i.e. East; the Latin word 'orient' had the same original meaning) in French. Even though it has been used for Syria, Lebanon, Jordan, and Palestine, it was used to refer to 'the sea in the east of Italy'.

Over time the term Levant was widened in scope. During the era of the Byzantines and the first years of the Ottomans, the term was used to refer to Western Mediterraneans such as Italians, Catalans, and French. During the 18th and 19th centuries, the term also was used for settlers that came from Central and Northern Europe.

History

First Levantines 
Levantines began to settle in Constantinople in 991 when they were given some trade privileges from the Byzantines. They settled on the Istanbul peninsula and Galata. Pera was the settlement of Genoese and Venetians. In later years, traders from Amalfi and Pisa were given these privileges.

After the fall of the Roman Empire, there were increasing differences between Latin-Western and Greek-Eastern Christians. According to Ortaylı, the first significant Levantines were Genoese merchants who had traded with Byzantines.

The second significant group of Levantines were Venetians. At that time, Eastern Roman power was decreasing while Ottomans were gaining ground. Venetian merchants traded across the Mediterranean during the Byzantine era and built the Galata Tower. Venetians and Ottomans were also allies against the Genoese-Byzantine alliance.

Genoese were more active in the Anatolian Peninsula while Venetians were powerful in the Aegean islands. There were also several Italian city-states that were active in and around Anatolia. The Crusades also played an important role in the lives of Levantines.

The cities chosen by Levantines were settled in important trade routes and they were also safer places. Istanbul was the center of the Ottoman Empire and Izmir was a safe city located within a gulf and feeding Istanbul with its potential. Izmir was also a center for fresh produce such as grapes, figs, olives, and okra. Consequently, Venetians and French began to settle in Izmir after Genoese traders. Over time Italian influence began to decrease and British, Dutch, and German merchants increased their ties with the Anatolian coast. They also married other non-Catholic and non-Protestant Christians, especially Greek Orthodox.

Capitulations and Tanzimat 
French merchants began to play an active role in Levant trade routes after the French-Ottoman alliance. Ottomans gave safe passage for French traders and approved the capitulations for the French state.

Especially after the Tanzimat Era, the Capitulations were approved for other European states. Consequently, there was a significant increase in the numbers of Europeans who came to Ottoman territories, especially in coastal cities. European traders were not Ottoman citizens, so they did not have to pay taxes nor were they obliged to serve in the army. Therefore, these Europeans became wealthier over time. In addition, they became pioneers in industrialization and Western Art.

20th century 
The Ottoman Empire fought against the British, French and Italians during World War I. The victorious states of World War I compelled the Ottoman government to sign the Treaty of Sèvres. The United Kingdom, Italy, and France were among the occupants of Anatolia. After the independence of Turkey, there was negative public opinion towards Levantines because of allegations that Levantines had cooperated with the Allies. After the Great Fire of Smyrna, most of the Levantines left Smyrna (now Izmir), and only a few ever returned.

After the Committee of Union and Progress (CUP) came into power after the 1908 Revolution, Levantines began to be affected by the policies of Turkish nationalists. It is also said, yet not proven, that Levantines were also not happy with the increasing Greek presence in the city of Smyrna. The Greek occupation in Smyrna weakened their economic power in the city. In addition, their economic interests suffered due to World War I and in the first years of modern Turkey. The Great Depression  affected Levantines significantly. They quit their jobs and began to leave Turkey due to new wealth taxes imposed on non-Moslems, the removal of Capitulations that had been granted by the Ottoman Sultans, as well as to rapidly rising costs. Their settlements became government property.

There were significant problems in the Turkish economy after the Levantines and Greeks left the country. Turkey faced export problems; most of its exports remained in the hands of local Turkish villagers who had relied on the Levantine export houses. [However, the Turkish government left all capitulations of Levantines in order to break the monopoly for Turkish entrepreneurs.] the Turkish government under the new Turkish Republic did remove the Capitulations.

Present 
Today, the exact number of Levantines is not clear. It is estimated that there are about 100-150 Levantines in Izmir. Another estimate put the number in the hundreds. However, the number may be higher because of the assimilation policies of Turkish nationalist-Kemalist governments, conversions to Islam because of fear after the Greek and Armenian genocides, or intermarriage. In the documentary about the Levantines of Izmir (Bazıları Onlara Levanten Diyor), Levantines call themselves 'Christian Turks', and they say they are not happy to be called Levantines.

Less than 100 Levantine families are left in Istanbul. However, the number is not clear. The Istanbul pogrom deeply affected the Levantine population as much as Greeks, Armenians, and Jews. After the Istanbul Pogrom, it is known that most of the Levantines fled to France, the United States, and other Western European countries. Most of them had second passports, or they only had one passport of the country of their ancestors. Many young Levantines preferred to go abroad rather than stay in Turkey. The remaining Levantines or their descendants have held meetings in Istanbul to protect their heritage and rediscover their past.

There are also several Levantines left in Mersin and Iskenderun. There are still some families in Mersin who are the descendants of Europeans: they often have the names of Levante, Montavani, Babini, Brecotti, Şaşati, Vitel, Talhuz, Antoine-Mirzan, Nadir, Rexya, Soysal, Hisarlı, Kokaz, Daniel, Kokalakis, or Yalnız. Mersin Catholic Church is still active in the city. Some of the members of the church are still Maronites.

Levantine population in the past

Istanbul (Constantinople) 

The first Levantines in the Ottoman territories lived in the Pera (Beyoğlu) and Galata districts of Constantinople, now known as Istanbul. The peak population of Levantines was during the 19th century, with 14,000 people.

Izmir (Smyrna) 
In 1818, traveller William Jowett described the distribution of Smyrna (now Izmir)'s population: Turks 60,000, Greeks 40,000, Jews 10,000, Latins 3,000, Armenians 7,000.

In 1856, the Ottoman state allowed Christians to have possessions. Consequently, the number of Levantines in Smyrna began to increase dramatically. The non-Muslim population was 15,000 in 1847, while it increased to 50,000 in 1880. Smyrna became a Levantine city and began to be known as 'the capital of the Levant', 'the pearl of the Levant', 'the Marseille of the Anatolian coast' or 'Marseille on the coast of Asia Minor'.

19th-century sources estimated the population of Levantines between 16,000 and 25,000. This amounts of a minimum of 8% of Smyrna's population, while the maximum estimate is 17%.

Non-Muslim peoples of Smyrna lived in different quarters. There was one each quarter for Turks, Greeks, Armenians, Jews, and Frenks (Levantines). 1914 population estimate indicates; 378,000 Muslims and 217,686 Orthodox Christians.

Mersin 
The Çukurova region gained importance after the planting of cotton that came from the Americas. Therefore, the cities of Adana and Mersin began to attract Europeans. Levantines especially began to settle in Mersin, especially after the 19th century. European entrepreneurs created the 'Frenk Quarter' in Mersin. The estimated population during Ottoman times is below:
In 1879, 625 Muslims, 147 Greeks, 37 Armenians, and 50 Catholics were living in Mersin.
In 1891, 5000 Muslims, 2700 Greeks, 860 Armenians, and 260 Catholics were living in Mersin.

Culture

Language 
There are some Levantine words that have been adopted in the Turkish language, such as "racon" (show-off) and "faça" (face).

Religion 
Levantines are Western Christians, separated by their sects. Most of them are Catholics, while there are Protestants (mainly Anglicans and Baptists) among them.

Levantines have their own churches in some cities. They are named according to their ethnicity or sect, such as Alman Protestan Kilisesi (German Protestant Church) or İzmir Baptist Kilisesi (Izmir Baptist Church). Churches in Izmir are sometimes called the 'Levantine Church'.

Churches

Education 
There are French, Italian, German, and Austrian schools in Istanbul and Izmir. However, most of their students are Turks. These schools are counted as private schools.

Schools

Architecture 
One of the oldest buildings of the Levantines is Galata Tower in Istanbul. It was in the European quarter until 1453. After the fall of Istanbul, Venetians surrendered the tower to Ottomans.

Izmir is the most important city for the remaining historic Levantine architecture. Karşıyaka (Courdelion), Bornova (Bournabad), and Buca (Boudja) were known as the center of Levantines in Izmir until the Turkish Independence War. Levantines left tens of buildings in Izmir; most of them are mansions once belonging to European merchant families. Some of them are listed below:

There are also some inns and konaks in Mersin that still stand today.

Notable people 
 Sir Alfred Biliotti - Italian soldier and archeologist
 Livio Missir di Lusignano - Italian historian
 Giuseppe Donizetti - Italian musician
 Giovanni Scognamillo - Italian writer
 Count Abraham Camondo - Jewish-Italian financier, philanthropist, and the patriarch of the Camondo family
 Lucien Arkas - French businessman of Arkas holding company
 William Buttigieg - Maltese-British, former British Consul at Izmir
 Caroline Giraud Koç - French businesswoman

References 

Italian diaspora
French diaspora
European diaspora in Turkey
Christian groups in the Middle East